Stuttgart High School is a public secondary school for students in grades 9 through 12 located in Stuttgart, Arkansas. The high school is administered by the Stuttgart Public Schools. It is located at the intersection of 22nd Street and Buerkle Road.

Its attendance area includes the unincorporated area of Casscoe.

Academics 
Students follow the Smart Core curriculum developed by the Arkansas Department of Education (ADE). Students complete regular (core and career focus) courses and exams and may select Advanced Placement (AP) coursework and exams that provide an opportunity to receive college credit.

Since 1998, Stuttgart has participated in the EAST Initiative.

Extracurricular activities 
The Stuttgart High School mascot and athletic emblem is the Ricebird with maroon and white serving as the school colors.

Athletics 
The Stuttgart Ricebirds compete in the 4A District 2 Conference in the 4A classification as administered by the Arkansas Activities Association in interscholastic activities and sports such as: football, basketball, baseball, golf, cheerleading, soccer, softball, track & field, bowling and tennis.
 Football: The Ricebirds football team are 8-time state football champions (1949, 1952, 1960 AP, 1970, 1975, 1982, 2002, 2012).
 Basketball: The boys basketball squad are 4-time state basketball champions  (1914, 1915, 1992, 2009).

References

External links 
 

Public high schools in Arkansas
Educational institutions established in 1924
Schools in Arkansas County, Arkansas
1924 establishments in Arkansas
High School